Dominator is a thrill ride located at Dorney Park & Wildwater Kingdom in Allentown, Pennsylvania. It was designed by S&S Worldwide and opened on May 8, 1999.

The ride
The Dominator is a 200-foot tall, three-tower structure. One of the towers features a Space Shot ride, where 12 riders are blasted upwards at speeds of up to 50 mph, to a height of 160 feet.

The second tower is a Turbo Drop ride, where 12 riders are lifted up 175 feet then released downwards at speeds of up to 40 mph. Both rides use compressed air to power the attraction.

Dominator originally planned to have a third tower as a Combo Tower, with both the Drop and Shot experiences in one. However, the original plan was cancelled because of technical limitations and the third tower has been since left as a support tower.

A total of twelve passengers may ride either of the attractions at one time. Riders sit in outward-facing, open-air seats with their backs to the towers and their legs left dangling.

See also
 Power Tower, a similar ride at Cedar Point and Valleyfair, two sister parks of Dorney Park.
 Demon Drop, another drop ride at Dorney Park.

References

External links
Official page

Amusement rides introduced in 1999
1999 establishments in Pennsylvania
Amusement rides manufactured by S&S – Sansei Technologies
Drop tower rides